Javier Rubio may refer to:

 Javi Rubio (footballer, born 1984), Spanish football midfielder
 Javi Rubio (footballer, born 1999), Spanish football right-back